Events from the year 1928 in Argentina

Incumbents
 President: Marcelo Torcuato de Alvear (until 11 October); Hipólito Yrigoyen (from 12 October)
 Vice president: Elpidio González (until 11 October); Enrique Martínez (from 12 October)

Governors
 Buenos Aires Province: Valentin Vergara 
 Cordoba: Ramón J. Cárcano then Enrique Martínez then José Antonio Ceballos 
 Mendoza Province: Alejandro Orfila (until 4 December); Carlos A. Borzani (from 4 December)

Vice Governors
 Buenos Aires Province: Victoriano de Ortúzar

Events
 April 1 – 1928 Argentine general election: Hipólito Yrigoyen replaces Marcelo Torcuato de Alvear, whom he had chosen as his successor, as presidential candidate and defeats his opponent Leopoldo Melo.
 May 23 – The Italian consulate in Buenos Aires, Argentina, is bombed. The explosion kills 22 people and injures 43.

Births
 January 28 – Jorge Zorreguieta, businessman and politician (died 2017)
 March 6 – Zoe Ducós, actress (died 2002)
 July 8 – Ángel Tulio Zof, footballer and coach (died 2014)

Deaths
 July 22 – Francisco Beiró, politician, vice president-elect (born 1876)

References

 
Years of the 20th century in Argentina